The Holcroft Covenant is a 1985 thriller film based on the 1978 Robert Ludlum novel of the same name. The film stars Michael Caine and was directed by John Frankenheimer.  The script was written by Edward Anhalt, George Axelrod, and John Hopkins.

Plot 
Noel Holcroft's late father - who was a general in the Wehrmacht and once close to Adolf Hitler - left behind a fortune supposedly to make amends for his wrongdoings. But more than forty years later, Noel finds himself embroiled in a web of conspiracies involving the children of two of his father's Nazi colleagues, a mysterious organisation supposedly devoted to ensuring the Nazis never again come to power, and a woman who may be Noel's downfall or his only hope.

Cast 
 Michael Caine as Noel Holcroft
 Anthony Andrews as Johann von Tiebolt/Jonathan Tennyson
 Victoria Tennant as Helden von Tiebolt/Helden Tennyson
 Lilli Palmer as Althene Holcroft
 Mario Adorf as Erich Kessler/Jürgen Maas
 Michael Lonsdale as Manfredi
 Bernard Hepton as Leighton
 Shane Rimmer as Lieutenant Miles
 Alexander Kerst as General Heinrich Clausen
 Michael Wolf as General Erich Kessler
 Richard Münch as Oberst

Production

Development
The film was part of a five picture slate from Thorn EMI in 1985, others including A Passage to India, Wild Geese II, Morons from Outer Space and Dreamchild.

Writing
Edy and Ely Landau bought the film rights to the novel along with The Chancellor Manuscript. The first draft of the script was done by John Hopkins before Edward Anhalt was brought in to do rewrites. However, when John Frankenheimer became attached as director, he got George Axelrod to rework most of the screenplay. Frankenheimer called the film "a conspiracy movie" about "a man's search for his father". The director added, "I love Ludlum. I'm a great fan of Ludlum. I buy Ludlum's books. I mean, I pay bookstore prices for Ludlum".

"The script I worked from was relatively humorless," says Axelrod. "When John and I suggested adding much more humor, the producers said they didn't want a Walter Matthau romp. But John told them he could take the script of Some Like It Hot and turn it into a social documentary on the effects of gang warfare on the music business in Chicago during Prohibition and how that affected women's liberation - and that they needn't worry about him being too funny." Axelrod admitted he did not read the novel because he didn't have time.

Casting
Renee Soutendijk was meant to have a role in the film but it was removed shortly before filming and she was told she was not required for filming. "In my opinion, it was central to the story but . . . such things have happened before," she said. "It's the American way of dealing with people. In the U.S. you become aware of just being a product. You're either money to them or you're not."

Although James Caan was originally cast as Noel Holcroft, he walked off the set due to disagreements with the producers. Director John Frankenheimer later said "I will be forever grateful to James Caan. Forever. Because he gave me the best gift that's ever happened to me in my career, which is Michael Caine." As far as I'm concerned, he is probably the best actor I've ever worked with," added Frankenheimer. "Certainly the best actor I've ever worked with who gets the girl."

Filming
Filming started in Berlin on 2 July 1984. After Caan left the film, filming resumed on 11 July.  Scenes were also shot in Munich, Lindau and London.

Release
The film was released on October 18, 1985. Against an $8 million budget, the film made only $393,825 in the United States during its initial release.

Reception
The film has mostly negative reviews. Variety said its troubled production had resulted in a film that has "a muddled narrative deficient in thrills or plausibility". Time Out London says all Caine does is  spend the film "jetting to international tourist locations so that he can be filled in on the next plot twist by an obliging minor character". The reviewer at Cinema Retro blamed "questionable" directorial decisions by John Frankenheimer, combined with "Ludlum’s lame storytelling" and "trying to turn the rambling, 528-page potboiler into a leaner 100-minute-long movie", for the film's failings.

On Rotten Tomatoes, the film holds a rating of 27% from 11 reviews.

Home media
The film has been released on DVD and Blu-ray.

References

External links

 
 

1985 films
1980s psychological thriller films
1980s spy thriller films
Films directed by John Frankenheimer
Films produced by Ely Landau
Films based on works by Robert Ludlum
Universal Pictures films
Films set in Berlin
Films set in West Germany
Films shot in Germany
Films based on American novels
EMI Films films
Films with screenplays by George Axelrod
Films with screenplays by Edward Anhalt
Films with screenplays by John Hopkins